Alka Nath (born 24 November 1951) is a political and social worker and a former member of parliament elected from the Chhindwara constituency in the Indian state of Madhya Pradesh as an Indian National Congress candidate.

Early life
Alka was born on 24 November 1951 in Amritsar. She married Kamal Nath on 27 January 1973 and has two sons Nakul Nath and Bakul Nath.

Education
Alka completed her Bachelor of Arts from Sacred Heart College, Dalhousie (Himachal Pradesh).

Career
Alka was elected to the 11th Lok Sabha in 1996.

References

External links 
 Kamal Nath Fronting for spouse
 Defeat in Chhindwara

India MPs 1996–1997
Women in Madhya Pradesh politics
Articles created or expanded during Women's History Month (India) - 2014
Living people
1951 births
Lok Sabha members from Madhya Pradesh
Politicians from Bhopal
People from Chhindwara district
Indian National Congress politicians from Madhya Pradesh
20th-century Indian women politicians
20th-century Indian politicians